Jejawi is a small town in Perlis, Malaysia.

Towns in Perlis
Mukims of Perlis